Tamara Antonovna Shaverzashvili (14 October 1891 – 18 September 1955) was a Georgian composer, pianist, and teacher who composed many children’s songs and received an Honored Worker in Art award. She published her music under the name Tamara Antonovna Shaverzashvili.

Shaverzashvili was born in Kutaisi. She graduated from the Tiflis Music School, where she studied piano and composition with V. Shcherbachevm and Iona Tuskia. Later, she studied with Pyotr Ryazanov.

Shaverzashvili taught piano privately, and from 1935 to 1938, lived in Tbilisi and taught at the Z. Paliashvili Central Music School. In 1938, she began teaching at the Tbilisi Conservatory and during her tenure there was awarded the Honored Worker in Art award in 1946. Baritone David Gamrekeli and pianist T. Dunenko recorded at least one of her songs commercially in 1938.

Shaverzashvili’s compositions included:

Chamber 

String Quartet

Suite (cello and piano; 1949)

Suite (for winds; 1938)

Orchestra 

Suite (1935)

Twelve Pieces from Children’s Suite

Two Marches

Piano 

Children’s Album (40 pieces; 1946)

Nocturne

Pastorale

Polyphonic Suite

Spinning Wheel

Twenty Children’s Pieces (1952)

Theater 

Spring

Spring and Summer

Vocal 

Fifty Songs for School Children (1923-1929)

“My Sadness” (text by Alexander Chavchavadze)

“Pesni Gor”

“Regret” (text by Ioseb Grishashvili)

Twelve Children’s Songs (1925)

Two Lullabies

External links
Hear Nocturne by Tamara Shaverzashvili

References 

Women composers
1891 births
1955 deaths
Honored Artists of the Georgian SSR
21st-century musicians from Georgia (country)
String quartet composers